Creo en ti is a 1960 Mexican film.

Cast

External links
 

1960 films
1960s Spanish-language films
Mexican black-and-white films
Films directed by Alfonso Corona Blake
1960s Mexican films